Filippo Dani (born 27 June 1999) is an Italian football player who plays for U.C. Montecchio Maggiore.

Club career
He made his professional debut in the Serie B for Vicenza on 25 February 2017 in a game against Avellino.

Ahead of the 2019-20 season, Dani joined U.C. Montecchio Maggiore.

References

External links
 
 

1999 births
Sportspeople from the Province of Vicenza
Living people
Italian footballers
L.R. Vicenza players
Serie B players
Serie D players
Association football goalkeepers
Footballers from Veneto